S.P.Q.R.: 2,000 and a Half Years Ago is a 1994 Italian comedy film directed by Carlo Vanzina and starring Christian De Sica, Massimo Boldi and Leslie Nielsen.

Plot
In 71 BC in Rome, Senator Lucio Cinico (Leslie Nielsen) rules the city by political intrigues and bribery. He is supported by Cesare Atticus (Christian De Sica) but the pair's reign is threatened by the incorruptible attorney, Antonio Servilio (Massimo Boldi), who has just arrived from Mediolanum. Cesare and Antonio first meet when the former accidentally crushes his carriage into the latter's. 

While Antonio is on the trail of Cesare, their children - Antonio's daughter Claudia and Cesare's son Alessio - begin an affair, but keep it secret from their rivaling fathers. Cesare manages to implicate Antonio in a sexual scandal involving several prostitutes. As punishment, Antonio is transferred to Sicily, where he exposes governor Verre's involvement in illicit kickbacks and money laundering and is allowed back to Rome. On suggestion by Cinico, Cesare tries to kill Antonio by letting poisonous snakes loose in Antonio's office. When Alessio enters the office to talk to Antonio, Atticus intervenes and kills the snakes to save his son. After this failed attempt, Cesare and Antonio reconcile and agree to expose Cynicus's corruption. They steal the senator's records, detailing all bribes from the last ten years.

During the subsequent trial, Antonio pleads that Cesare, who admitted all his wrongdoings, should be treated leniently and Cinico, as the mastermind of corruption, be sent into exile. However, Cinico, speaking in his own defense, manages to convince the jury that his bribes were actually "contributions for the common good", enabling Romans to lives of luxury. Cynicus is acquitted while Cesare and Antionio are sentenced to hard labour in the quarries. Here, Cesare and Antonio join a rebellions led by Spartacus. As the rebellion is crushed, Cesar and Antonio are crucified among the rebels along the Via Appia.

2,000 years later, on the same road, two characters, Cesare and Antonio, are involved in a car crash and start a fight just like their namesakes long ago.

Cast
 Christian De Sica as Cesare Atticus
 Massimo Boldi as Antonio Servilio
 Leslie Nielsen as Lucio Cinico
 Nadia Rinaldi as Cornelia
 Marco Vivio as Alessio
 Isabella Rocchietta as Claudia
 Anna Falchi as Poppea
 Gabriella Labate as Ottavia
 Cash Casia as Iside
 Virginie Marsan as Flavietta
 Ugo Conti as Silvio Zebio
 Luigi Maria Burruano as Varrone
 Francesco De Rosa as Publio 
 Rossana Di Lorenzo as Rosa
 Massimo Ceccherini as Client of the brothel
 Riccardo Rossi as Lucio Sola 
 Gastone Pescucci as Aurispex

References

External links

1994 films
Italian comedy films
English-language Italian films
1994 comedy films
Films set in ancient Rome
Films set in the 1st century BC
Films directed by Carlo Vanzina